The women's association football tournament at the 2008 Summer Olympics was held in Beijing and four other cities in China from 6 to 21 August. Associations affiliated with FIFA were invited to send their full women's national teams.

For these Games, the women competed in a 12-team tournament. Preliminary matches commenced on 6 August, two days before the Opening Ceremony of the Games. The teams were grouped into three pools of four teams each for a round-robin preliminary round. The top two teams in each pool, as well as the best two third-place finishing teams, advanced to an eight-team single-elimination bracket.

The tournament was won by the United States, which beat Brazil 1–0 in the gold medal game. Carli Lloyd scored the game-winning goal in the 96th minute for the United States, which collected their third Olympic gold medal.

Qualifying

A National Olympic Committee may enter one women's team for the football competition.

 Note – The three best ranked European teams at the FIFA Women's World Cup qualified for the Olympics. However, the third best team England could not participate, because England competes at the Olympic Games as part of Great Britain, which does not compete in football. Therefore, the fourth European team would advance, requiring a play-off between Sweden and Denmark.

Venues

The tournament was held in five venues across five cities:
Workers' Stadium, Beijing
Qinhuangdao Olympic Sports Center Stadium, Qinhuangdao
Shanghai Stadium, Shanghai
Shenyang Olympic Sports Center Stadium, Shenyang
Tianjin Olympic Center Stadium, Tianjin

Seeding

Squads

The women's tournament is a full international tournament with no restrictions on age.  Each nation must submit a squad of 18 players by 23 July 2008. A minimum of two goalkeepers (plus one optional alternate goalkeeper) must be included in the squad.

Match officials

Group stage
Group winners and runners-up, plus two best third place teams advanced to quarter final round.  Groups are lettered sequentially from the last letter in the Men's Football tournament (which has Groups A through D).

All times are China Standard Time (UTC+8)

Group E

Group F

Group G

Ranking of third-placed teams

Knockout stage

Quarter-finals

Semi-finals

Bronze medal match

Gold medal match

Statistics

Goalscorers

Assists

FIFA Fair Play Award
China PR won the FIFA Fair Play Award, given to the team with the best record of fair play during the tournament. Every match in the tournament was taken into account, though only teams that reached the knockout stage were eligible to win the award.

Tournament ranking

References

External links
Olympic Football Tournaments Beijing 2008 - Women, FIFA.com
RSSSF Summary

FIFA Technical Report

 
2008
2008
Oly
Women's events at the 2008 Summer Olympics